CJTK-FM is a Canadian radio station, which airs Christian music and programming at 95.5 FM in Sudbury, Ontario. The station is owned by Eternacom, and was licensed by the CRTC in 1997. The station is branded as KFM and uses one of the current slogans as "Positive & Encouraging".

History
On June 6, 1997, Curtis Belcher, the owner of Enternacom Inc., received CRTC approval to operate a new Christian music radio station in Sudbury and began broadcasting later that same year.

CJTK-FM started as a small low-power 35 watt FM radio station in Sudbury at 95.5 FM in late 1997, which CJTK became the first Christian station to be granted a power increase, and go from low-power status (35 watts), to a full power (1,400 watts).

In 2000, the station received approval to add an FM rebroadcaster at North Bay to operate on the frequency, 89.5 MHz. In 2005, CJTK-FM applied to change North Bay's frequency from 89.5 to 107.3 FM, although when the application was approved, the station would operate at 103.5 MHz instead. Once the change took place, the CJTK-FM-1 operating at 89.5 was deleted. On December 5, 2005, CJTK received approval to add a rebroadcaster at Little Current on the frequency, 102.1 MHz and began broadcasting in September 2006. A repeater was also added in Elliot Lake on 102.5 MHz in 2008.

The Canadian Communications Foundation website reports that in 2007, Eternacom received approval to change the authorized contours of CJTK-FM by increasing effective radiated power from 1,400 watts to 8,100 watts. It's uncertain if there are any CRTC decision references regarding the power increase to 8.1 kW.

In 2009, CJTK adopted its current logo and branding as KFM. Both the current and the former logo are still used on CJTK's website. The station's former brandings were known as K95.5, or just simply the K and was also used on CJTK's other repeaters.

CJTK will be the new play-by-play voice of the Sudbury Wolves for the upcoming 2009-2010 Ontario Hockey League season. The Sudbury Wolves games were formerly aired on CIGM.

On October 11, 2011, Eternacom Inc. applied to add a new low-power FM transmitter in Mattawa, Ontario, which will rebroadcast the programming of CJTK-FM-1 North Bay. The proposed new FM transmitter was approved on December 6, 2011, and will operate in Mattawa at 93.9 MHz. This will be Mattawa's first local FM signal in that community.

On March 30, 2015, the CRTC approved Eternacom's application to add an FM transmitter at Timmins, which will rebroadcast CJTK-FM on 105.5 MHz.

On August 16, 2018, the Commission approved an application by Eternacom Inc. (Eternacom), on behalf of Harvest Ministries Sudbury, for authority to acquire from Eternacom the assets of the English-language commercial specialty (Christian music) radio stations CJTK-FM Sudbury, CJTK FM-1 North Bay and CJTK-FM-3 Elliot Lake, Ontario, and their rebroadcasting transmitters and for broadcasting licences to continue the operation of the stations.

CKBB-FM
In 2001, Eternacom launched a sister station, CKBB-FM, airing tourist information programming at 102.9 FM in Sudbury. The station was branded as STIR Sudbury's Tourism and Information Radio. CKBB-FM went dark in 2005. Despite the station ceasing operations, on June 5, 2006, the CRTC renewed CKBB-FM's licence from September 1, 2006, to August 31, 2013, although the station never actually relaunched.

Transmitters

The rebroadcaster in North Bay airs its own separate morning program, but simulcasts the Sudbury station the rest of the time. Eternacom also has a rebroadcaster at Elliot Lake, which also offers some local programming.

On January 5 and 6, 2017, Eternacom Inc, applied to add six new FM transmitters to rebroadcast CJTK-FM to the following communities.

New Liskeard
Englehart
Sault Ste. Marie
Sundridge
Spring Bay
Iroquois Falls

Eternacom received approval to add the new FM transmitters on June 19, 2017. Most of these new transmitters had already signed on the air in late 2017 and 2018. Eternacom, the owners of CJTK-FM plans to expand up to 20 stations by 2020.

On May 22, 2019, Harvest Ministries Sudbury  applied to add a new FM transmitter to rebroadcast CJTK-FM at Kapuskasing on the frequency of 88.5 MHz. This application was approved by the CRTC on September 4, 2019.

See also
Christian radio

References

External links
 KFM

 95.5 
 102.9 defunct tourist information station 2001–2005.

Jtk
Jtk
Radio stations established in 1997
1997 establishments in Ontario